Marzano is a comune (municipality) in the Province of Pavia in the Italian region Lombardy, located about 25 km southeast of Milan and about 14 km northeast of Pavia.

Marzano borders the following municipalities: Ceranova, Lardirago, Roncaro, Torre d'Arese, Torrevecchia Pia, Valera Fratta, Vidigulfo and Vistarino.

References

Cities and towns in Lombardy